Elliot Bale (born ) is a British rugby union player, currently playing with English National League 1 side Birmingham Moseley Rugby Club. His position is fly-half.

Background

Bale attended Lawrence Sheriff School and University of Bedfordshire.

Rugby career

Leicester Tigers

Bale signed for Leicester Tigers Academy aged 16 and was part of the squad to remain unbeaten in 2010, successfully defeating England U20s in the final match.

Plymouth Albion

Bale moved to Plymouth Albion R.F.C. in National League 1 for the 2015-2016 season, having been a product of Leicester Tigers Academy.

Birmingham Moseley

Bale signed for Birmingham Moseley Rugby Club in National League 1  for the 2016-2017 season.

It was announced September 5, 2019 Bale had signed for Rugby club Châteaurenard in Provence, France.

References

1991 births
Living people
British rugby union players
Alumni of the University of Bedfordshire
People educated at Lawrence Sheriff School
Rugby union fly-halves
Rugby union players from Rugby, Warwickshire